Donald E. Manning II (May 28, 1967 – March 20, 2020) was an American politician who served as a member of the Ohio House of Representatives, representing the 59th district from 2019 to 2020.

Career 
A Republican, Manning's district included suburban Youngstown as well as rural Mahoning County. Manning previously served in the United States Navy aboard the aircraft carrier . He had also worked in the criminal justice system and served on the New Middletown Village council, and was active with youth service.

Manning previously ran in 2016, losing to incumbent John Boccieri. In 2018, Boccieri ran for the Ohio Senate, and Manning ran for his vacant seat in the House of Representatives. Manning defeated Democrat Eric Ungaro, 50.35% to 49.65%.

As a candidate, Manning was interviewed by Ohio Advocates for Medical Freedom, expressing his strong support of their views that vaccinations should not be mandated by any government entity, saying that "any time we have an opportunity to keep the Government out of our lives, I'm on board." Manning received the group's Verified Candidate designation for his views.

Two months after taking office as State Representative, Manning introduced legislation (House Bill 132) that would require school officials to provide the legal exemptions as well as the state-mandated vaccination requirements.

Death 
Manning died suddenly on March 20, 2020, after being taken to a Youngstown hospital for chest pains.

References

External links 
 Representative Don Manning (official site)

1965 births
2020 deaths
American prison officers
Republican Party members of the Ohio House of Representatives
Military personnel from Ohio
Ohio city council members
Politicians from Youngstown, Ohio
21st-century American politicians
United States Navy sailors